Sophia Muetterties (born 12 November 2001) is a Puerto Rican footballer who plays as a midfielder for the Puerto Rico women's national team.

International career

In June 2021, Muetterties accepted a call-up to the Puerto Rican women's national football team. On 12 June, she made her debut as a halftime substitute in a 5–1 friendly loss to Uruguay. In October 2021, Muetterties scored the winning goal in Puerto Rico's 2–1 friendly victory over Guyana, netting in the 83rd minute.

International goals
 Scores and results list Puerto Rico's goal tally first, score column indicates score after each Muetterties goal.

References

2001 births
Living people
Women's association football midfielders
American women's soccer players
Puerto Rican women's footballers
Puerto Rico women's international footballers
Soccer players from Pennsylvania
People from Delaware County, Pennsylvania
High Point Panthers women's soccer players
Queens University of Charlotte alumni